Dick Putz Field is a stadium in St. Cloud, Minnesota. It is primarily used for baseball, and is the former home of the St. Cloud Rox of the defunct Class C Northern League as well as the St. Cloud River Bats collegiate league baseball team, who currently play at Joe Faber Field. It was built in 1971 and holds 2,200 people. Dick Putz Field, along with Joe Faber Field, co-hosts the Minnesota State High School League Class AA state baseball tournament.

The field was named for Dick Putz, a St. Cloud sports official, athletic booster, and radio host, in 1988.

MAC
Dick Putz Field is part of the Municipal Athletic Complex, which has two baseball Fields (Dick Putz Field and Joe Faber Field), a golf course (Veterans Public Golf Course), and two Hockey Arenas (Torrey Arena and Ritsche Arena).

References

Sports venues in Minnesota
Minor league baseball venues
Buildings and structures in St. Cloud, Minnesota